Khiaraj (also Romanized as Khīāraj and Khīyaraj) is a village in Ramand-e Jonubi Rural District, Ramand District, Buin Zahra County, Qazvin Province, Iran. At the 2006 census, its population was 1,195, in 334 families.

References 

Populated places in Buin Zahra County